FAUC50 is a covalent agonist of the β2 adrenoceptor. It has been used as a template to form covalent agonists for other receptors.

References 

Dopamine agonists
Irreversible agonists